Louis Nelson (born 1936, New York) is an American industrial designer and graphic artist who is best known for designing the Mural Wall for the Korean War Veterans Memorial on the National Mall in Washington.

Career 
Louis Nelson graduated with a degree in Industrial Design from Pratt Institute in New York City in 1958.

From 1958 until 1962 he served in the US military, where he became a Captain and helicopter instructor.

After the Army, Louis returned to Pratt Institute, where he graduated with a master's degree in Industrial Design in 1964.

Louis Nelson designed the Mural Wall of the Korean War Veterans Memorial located in Washington. He also designed the Dag Hammarskjöld Medal, as well as the nutrition facts label that appears on food packages in America.

Awards and recognition
Louis Nelson has been honored by several industry designer organizations and magazines:

 2013: Career Achievement Award, Pratt Institute
 AIGA
 Industrial Design Excellence Award: Silver 
 American Corporate Identity
 Art Directors Club (NY & LA) 
 British Design & Art Direction 
 Clio Awards 
 IABC

Personal life 
In April 1996, he married musician Judy Collins, whom he had been seeing since 1978. They live in Manhattan.

References

External links 
 Official website

American industrial designers
1936 births
American graphic designers
Living people